Ian Livingstone (born 1949) is an English fantasy author and video games entrepreneur.

Ian Livingstone may also refer to:

Ian Livingstone (composer), British composer
Ian Livingstone (economist) (1933–2001), British development economist
Ian Livingstone (property developer) (born 1962), British property developer
Ian Lang Livingstone (born 1938), Scottish businessman
Ian Livingston, Baron Livingston of Parkhead (born 1964), British Minister of State for Trade and Investment (Conservative), former CEO of British Telecom